Vijayapuri may refer to:
 Vijayapuri (Erode), a census town in Erode district, Tamil Nadu, India
 Vijayapuri (North), a census town in Nalgonda district, Andhra Pradesh, India
 Vijayapuri (South), a village in Guntur district, Andhra Pradesh, India
 The ancient name for present-day Nagarjunakonda